Wil Schroder (born June 29, 1982) is an American politician who served in the Kentucky Senate representing the 24th district from 2015 to 2023. His father, Wilfrid Schroder, served on the Kentucky Supreme Court. He announced on May 22, 2021, that he would not run for re-election in 2022.

References

1982 births
Living people
Republican Party Kentucky state senators
People from Campbell County, Kentucky
21st-century American politicians